Surya Sen College, is an undergraduate government aided degree college, established in 1998, offers honours and general degree courses in Science, arts and commerce. It also offers Master's degree in few subjects. The campus is located in urban area in Siliguri near NJP.

Affiliations

Currently it is affiliated to University of North Bengal for Under Graduate courses & University of Kalyani for Post Graduate courses.

Faculty

Science
 Physics
 Chemistry
 Mathematics

Commerce

 Accountancy
 Management

Arts
 Geography
 English
 Economics
 Environmental Science
 Education
 History
 Political Science
 Bengali
 Sociology

Vocational
 Computer Application
 Tour & Travel Management

Accreditation
The college is recognized by the University Grants Commission (UGC). This is a NAAC accredited institution & also an ISO 9001 certified institution.

See also

References

External links
Surya Sen Mahavidyalaya
University of North Bengal
University Grants Commission
National Assessment and Accreditation Council

Colleges affiliated to University of North Bengal
Educational institutions established in 1998
Universities and colleges in Darjeeling district
Education in Siliguri
1998 establishments in West Bengal